20 and 21 June 1981 The events of 30th and 31st of Khordad 1360 were street demonstrations and clashes that happened at the time of the political inadequacy of the then president Abul Hassan Bani Sadr in the Islamic Council and were organized by the People's Mojahedin Khalq organization.

The 20 June 1981 Iranian protests, also known as the 30 Khordad protests, was a one-day anti–Islamic Republic protest organized by the People's Mujahedin of Iran on 20 June 1981 in various Iranian cities in response to the impeachment of the then president Abolhassan Banisadr. 

introductions

At this point, the only political force that still publicly supported Abolhassan Bani Sadr was the People's Mojahedin Khalq Organization.  On 29 June 1360, Masoud Rajavi, the then leader of the Mujahideen Khalq, along with Bani Sadr, who is in hiding, called the people to an uprising and asked their supporters to appear in the streets against the government.  The next day, demonstrations on June 30, 1360 were held in Tehran and other cities, which the government severely suppressed.[4]

A few days before June 30 and in order to lay the groundwork for Bani Sadr's dismissal by the Majlis with the majority of the Islamic Republic Party, the Center's Revolutionary Prosecutor's Office headed by Asadullah Lajordi had announced the prohibition of holding any demonstrations in Tehran.  But despite this order, on June 30, thousands of people came to the streets in Tehran and other cities to protest the removal of the president and the removal of critics.  These demonstrations were held in different cities of the country, such as Tehran, Isfahan, Tabriz, Shiraz, Mashhad, Ahvaz, Arak, Zahedan, Sanandaj, Hamadan, Bandar Abbas, and Urmia [1].  Clashes in Tehran often took place in the central parts of the city, including Revolution Street, Ferdowsi Square, Monirieh Square, Taleghani Street, Vali Asr Street, etc. [1] The government reacted quickly with the announcement of Ayatollah Khomeini and other clerics supporting him. [5]  ]

Akbar Hashemi Rafsanjani, the chairman of the Islamic Shura Council at the time, recounts the riots of 30 Khordad in his memoirs as follows:[6]

The groups of Mojahedin Khalq and Pikaar and Ranjbaran and the minority of devotees, etc., had made extensive preparations to create chaos and prevent the work of the parliament and somehow announced an armed struggle.  They poured into the streets from four o'clock in the afternoon and started destruction, murder, looting and chaos in Tehran and many cities.  Little by little, the IRGC forces, the committees and the Hizbollahs rose up to confront.  I was in parliament.  The sound of shooting could be heard from several parts of the city.  The news of the injury and martyrdom of some people also arrived... Near the evening, Mr. Zavarei, the head of the security headquarters, came and brought the recorded tape on the telephone communications of the People's Mojahedin Khalq command center with the liaisons of the street riots, which specified their extensive plan of destruction and riots.  Early in the night, the rioters were defeated and dispersed, without accomplishing anything important, except for the destruction of a few cars and the death and injury of a few people on both sides.

During these days, a number of people who had kept Bani Sadr safe from the possibility of arrest by hiding him from June 25 of the same year until he left the country were arrested.  Some of these people were executed, some were imprisoned and some (including Dariush Forohar) were murdered in the following years.

opinions 

According to Mansour Hekmat, the demonstrations of 30 Khordad 1360 were the end point of the Iranian people's revolution, which had started from the demonstrations of 17 Shahrivar, and during this interval, domestic and foreign right-wing forces tried to stop the people's revolution.  According to him, with the rise of popular protests, Mohammad Reza Shah's government was unable to suppress the people, and the media and Western governments, who felt the danger of the victory of the revolution, tried to strengthen the Islamic movement and the leadership of the Islamists.  Nevertheless, until June 30, 1998, there was still a semi-open space and the Islamic Republic had not been able to fully establish its government, and the stabilization of this government was realized after the suppression of the protests on June 30, 1999.  At the same time as the 20th anniversary of these protests, he launched a campaign called "disclosing the incident of 30 Khordad and commemorating the victims of 30 Khordad".

Background

A few days before the protest, Asadollah Lajevardi ordered the arrests of Massoud Rajavi and Mousa Khiabani; but the security forces could not locate them.

Events
On 20 June 1981 protests were seen in Tehran, Isfahan, Urmia, Shiraz, Arak, Ahvaz, and Bandar Abbas. Protests in Tehran were focused in the city centre and around areas such as Enghelab street, Ferdowsi square, Moniriyeh square, Taleghani street, and Vali Asr street. The government responded swiftly, at least 16 were killed and 1000 arrested near the University of Tehran.

References

Protests in Iran
1981 protests
1981 in Iran
June 1981 events in Asia